Stolen Diamonds is the eighth studio album by Melbourne band The Cat Empire. It was produced by Jan Skubiszewski and released on 15 February 2019 through Two Shoes Records. It debuted at Number 4 on the Australian ARIA Albums Chart, making it the band's sixth top 10 debut, following Rising with the Sun (2016). To promote the album, the band released a new single on the first of each month leading up to the release, starting with "Ready Now" on 1 July 2018. Next released was "Stolen Diamonds" in August, followed by "La Sirene" in September, "Kila" in October, "Sola" in November, "Barricades" in December, "Oscar Wilde" in January and "Echoes" in February.

Reception 
Melbourne magazine Beat rated the album 7 out of 10, stating: "The album barely takes a break from its upbeat tempo, and flows seamlessly between funk, reggae, and ska...". They went on to say that the album "...sees The Cat Empire take one step closer towards legend status."

Double J presented Stolen Diamonds as its feature album, and was also very positive in its review, saying: "The worst thing about Stolen Diamonds is that you’re gonna need to clear some space around you if you're planning on listening to it. Because this is very much a record that inspires movement."

While giving the album 3 out of 5 stars, The Sydney Morning Herald gave a more critical review, writing: "...the moves are there, the playing is very fine, but nothing lasts once you've stopped moving."

Track listing

Personnel 

The Cat Empire core members
 Harry James Angus – vocals, trumpet
 Will Hull-Brown – drums, percussion
 Jamshid Khadiwhala – turntables, percussion
 Ollie McGill – piano, organ, backing vocals
 Ryan Monro – bass guitar
 Felix Riebl – lead vocals, percussion

The Empire Horns (auxiliary members)
 Kieran Conrau – trombone, backing vocals
 Ross Irwin – trumpet, backing vocals
 Phil Noy – baritone saxophone
Additional musicians
 Eloise Mignon – vocals (track 7)
 Depedro – vocals (track 13)

Recording details
 Produced by – Jan Skubiszewski
 Mixing – Jan Skubiszewski
 Engineering – Jan Skubiszewski
 Mastered by – Adam Ayan
 Studio – Red Moon Studios (engineering, mixing); Gateway Mastering (mastering)

Charts

Weekly charts

Year-end charts

References

External links 
 The Cat Empire home page

2019 albums
The Cat Empire albums